This is a comprehensive discography of Babyshambles, a London, England-based Indie rock band. As of July 2013, they had released three studio albums, seven singles, three EPs and one live album.

Studio albums

Live albums

Extended plays

Singles

Notes:

A^ "Side of the Road" was released as a 7" vinyl only single for Record Store Day 2010. It was limited to 1,000 copies.

B-sides

Peter Doherty, (under the name of Babyshambles) also released an acoustic version of The Libertines song "What Katie Did" through a French magazine called Amelia's Magazine. This very rare (only 1000 copies) clear flexi-disk was attached to the front of issue number 1 of the magazine which quickly sold out. It is now a collectable for any fan and can sometimes be found on auction sites such as eBay.

DVDs

Music videos

Free releases

"Beg, Steal or Borrow" (2006), given away with tickets to Get Loaded In The Park only.
"Dirty Fame" (2006), given away with The Big Issue (download only)
"The Blinding" (2006), given away with The Big Issue
"Delivery (Acoustic Version)" (2007), given away as 7" vinyl with NME magazine.
"Stone Me, What A Life!" (2007), given away for LMHR CD with NME magazine.

References

Discographies of British artists
Rock music group discographies